This page contains a list of observed/candidate gravitational wave events.

Timeline and nomenclature
Direct observation of gravitational waves, which commenced with the detection of an event by LIGO in 2015, plays a key role in gravitational wave astronomy. LIGO has been involved in all subsequent detections to date, with Virgo joining in August 2017. Observation runs, designated "O1, O2, etc." span many months, with months of maintenance and upgrades in-between designed to increase the instruments sensitivity and range. Within these run periods, the instruments are capable of detecting gravitational waves.

The first run, O1, ran from Sep 12, 2015 to Jan 19, 2016, and succeeded in its first gravitational wave detection. O2 ran for a greater duration, from Nov 30, 2016 to Aug 25, 2017. O3 began on April 1st, 2019, which was briefly suspended on Sep 30, 2019 for maintenance and upgrades, thus O3a. O3b marks resuming of the run and began on Nov 1, 2019. Due to the COVID-19 pandemic O3 was forced to end prematurely. O4 is planned to begin in May 2023; initially planned for March, the project needed more time to stabilize the instruments. The O4 observing run has been extended from one year to 18 months, because technology planted for O5 is still under development. Updated observing plans are published on the official website.

Gravitational wave events are named starting with the prefix GW, while observations that trigger an event alert but have not (yet) been confirmed are named starting with the prefix S. Six digits then indicate the final two digits of the year the event was observed, two digits for the month and two digits for the day of observation. This is similar to the systematic naming for other kinds of astronomical event observations, such as those of gamma-ray bursts. 

Probable detections that are not confidently identified as gravitational wave events are designated LVT ("LIGO-Virgo trigger"). Known gravitational wave events come from the merger of two black holes (BH), two neutron stars (NS), or a black hole and a neutron star (BHNS). Some objects are in the mass gap between the largest predicted neutron star masses (Tolman–Oppenheimer–Volkoff limit) and the smallest known black holes.

List of gravitational wave events

Candidate events and marginal detections

Marginal detections from O1 and O2
In addition to well-constrained detections listed above, a number of low-significance detections of possible signals were made by LIGO and Virgo. Their characteristics are listed below:

Observation candidates from O3/2019
From observation run O3/2019 on, observations are published as Open Public Alerts to facilitate multi-messenger observations of events. Candidate event records can be directly accessed at the Gravitational-Wave Candidate Event Database (GraceDB). On 1 April 2019, the start of the third observation run was announced with a circular published in the public alerts tracker. The first O3/2019 binary black hole detection alert was broadcast on 8 April 2019. A significant percentage of O3 candidate events detected by LIGO are accompanied by corresponding triggers at Virgo. 

False alarm rates are mixed, with more than half of events assigned false alarm rates greater than 1 per 20 years, contingent on presence of glitches around signal, foreground electromagnetic instability, seismic activity, and operational status of any one of the three LIGO-Virgo instruments. For instance, events S190421ar and S190425z weren't detected by Virgo and LIGO's Hanford site, respectively.

The LIGO/Virgo collaboration took a short break from observing during the month of October 2019 to improve performance and prepare for future plans, with no signals detected in that month as a result.

The Kamioka Gravitational Wave Detector (KAGRA) in Japan became operational on 25 February 2020, likely improving the detection and localization of future gravitational wave signals. However, KAGRA does not report their signals in real-time on GraceDB as LIGO and Virgo do, so the results of their observation run will likely not be published until the end of O3.

The LIGO-Virgo collaboration ended the O3 run early on March 27, 2020 due to health concerns from the COVID-19 pandemic. On 15 June 2022, LIGO announced to start the O4 observing run in March 2023.

See also
 GRB 150101B, a weak gamma-ray burst trigger observed prior to aLIGO O1 (beginning September 12, 2015), with claimed similarities to model-supported possible neutron star merger GW170817/GRB 170817A/AT2017gfo.

Notes

References

External links
 
 

List
Gravitational waves
Gravitational waves
Observational astronomy
Binary systems